Ku Meng-yu was a politician in the Republic of China. He was the Vice Premier in 1948.

References

Political office-holders in the Republic of China
1888 births
1972 deaths
Taiwanese people from Beijing